Throwball is a non-contact ball sport played across a net between two teams of nine players on a rectangular court.

Throwball is popular in Asia, especially on the Indian subcontinent, and was first played in India as a women's sport in Chennai during the 1940s. Like volleyball, the game's roots are linked with the YMCA (Young Men's Christian Association). Both volleyball and Newcomb ball, while older games, share many similarities with throwball. Throwball rules were first drafted in 1955 and India's first national level championship was played in 1980.

The International Throwball Federation is the highest governing body for the sport.

History
According to the Throwball Federation of India (TFI), throwball is thought to derive from a recreational sport popular among women in England and Australia during the 1930s. The YMCA brought the game to Chennai, where it was played as a women's sport in the 1940s.

Harry Crowe Buck, who founded the YMCA College of Physical Education in Chennai, drafted guidelines for throwball rules and regulations in 1955. In addition, Mr. Jagat Singh Chauhan was the founder/father of throwball, handball, and netball in India. The game reached Bangalore in the 1950s.

Throwball Federation of India (TFI) was formed along with the Indian National Throwball Championship. By 1990, Throwball in India developed separate competitions for both men and women.

Rules and play

Court

Ball
The ball is similar to a volleyball but may be slightly larger. While in volleyball the ball is hit or volleyed throughout play, in throwball the ball is thrown over the net, where a member of the other team tries to catch the ball and quickly throw it back across the net.

Play

Teams

An official game is played between two teams of nine or seven players. A minimum of three or five substitute players are allowed for each team, which can make a maximum of three substitutions during a set. A team can take two time-outs of 30 seconds each during a set. The first team to score 25 points wins a set. A match is three sets.

Service
Service is within five seconds after the referee whistles and is done from the service zone, without crossing the end line. A player can jump while serving the ball. The service ball must not touch the net. Double touch is not allowed for receiving the service ball and players stay in 2-3-2 position during the serve.

Rally
During a rally, the ball must be caught at once with both hands, without any movement of the ball within the hands (dubs) and the ball should not have contact with the ground. The ball is thrown within three seconds after being caught, only from above the shoulder line and only with one hand. A player can jump when throwing the ball, which can touch the net (but not the antenna). The player should have contact with the ground when catching the ball. However, the ball is not touched by any part of the body other than the palm when catching or throwing (body touch). The ball can neither be shifted (passed) to the left or right nor deliberately pushed. Two players are not allowed to catch the ball simultaneously.

Uniforms
In official play, teams wear shorts and jersey uniform with numbers only in the range of 1–12 printed front and back.

Current status
Throwball is gaining popularity in India as a competitive sport. The Indian authorities of throwball were instrumental in organizing the Asian level and later, the world level association for the sport, the International Throwball Association. Throwball is a popular sport played in gym class, colleges, and clubs throughout Asian countries such as India, Sri Lanka, Korea, Thailand, Malaysia, Japan, China, Pakistan, Nepal, Bhutan and Bangladesh. It has been slowly gaining popularity in other countries such as France, Australia, Brazil, Canada and the United Kingdom.

Major competitions

Domestic competitions

India

Mr. Jagat Singh Chauhan was founder/father of handball, netball and Throwball in India. In India, the National Throwball Championship is organized by the Throwball Federation of India.

International competitions

Kuala Lampur
A Junior International Throwball Match was conducted in Kuala Lumpur, Malaysia in December 2015; eight countries participated.

References

External links
International Throwball Federation
Pakistan Throwball Federation

Ball games
Team sports
Articles containing video clips
YMCA
Women's sports
History of women's sports